Yvette, the Fashion Princess is a 1922 German silent comedy film directed by Frederic Zelnik and starring Lya Mara, Erich Kaiser-Titz, and Robert Scholz.

The film's sets were designed by the art director Fritz Lederer.

Cast
In alphabetical order
Else Berna
Karl Harbacher
Erich Kaiser-Titz
Lya Mara
Arnold Rieck
Robert Scholz
Fritz Schulz
Magnus Stifter

References

External links

Films of the Weimar Republic
Films directed by Frederic Zelnik
German silent feature films
German black-and-white films
German comedy films
1922 comedy films
Silent comedy films
1920s German films
1920s German-language films